This is a list of properties and districts in Lanier County, Georgia that are listed on the National Register of Historic Places (NRHP).

Current listing

|}

References

Lanier
Buildings and structures in Lanier County, Georgia